Ustad Niaz Mohammad Chowdhury (born 25 October 1952) is a Bangladeshi classical and modern singer.

Early life
Chowdhury was born on 25 October 1952 (13 January; according to certificate) at Khayinakut village at Shibpur Upazila in Narsingdi District of the then East Pakistan (now Bangladesh). He completed his Secondary School Certificate from Nabakumar Institution in 1967 and Higher Secondary School Certificate from Dhaka College in 1969. He graduated from Dhaka University.

Chowdhury received his first training from Ustad Ayatullah Khan at his young age. Later on he was trained by the Ustad Amanat Ali Khan and Ustad Bade Fateh Ali Khan at Patiala gharana.

Career
Chowdhury performed for the first time in 1985 at Bangladesh Television in a live program titled Amar joto gaan by Abu Hena Mustafa Kamal. He performed in Singapore and Malaysia in March 1979. His first song as a playback singer was in the film Gahi Kahi Sangit Kahi directed by Ehtesham.

Students
 Tanzir Tuhin

Discography
 Jibanananda
 Adhonik Bangla Gaan-1
 Shapane
 Ustad Niaz Mohammad Chowdhury

References

External links
 

1952 births
Living people
20th-century Bangladeshi male singers
20th-century Bangladeshi singers
University of Dhaka alumni
People from Narsingdi District
G-Series (record label) artists
21st-century Bangladeshi male singers
21st-century Bangladeshi singers